Lesbia is a small genus of hummingbird. Its two members, both known as trainbearers, are found in tropical South America. They are:

References

ITIS

 
 
Taxa named by René Lesson